Campiglossa grandinata is a species of tephritid, fruit flies in the family Tephritidae.

Distribution
The species is found in North and Central Europe, North and Central Russia, Kazakhstan, Mongolia.

References

Tephritinae
Diptera of Asia
Diptera of Europe
Insects described in 1870
Taxa named by Camillo Rondani